Ein Haus in der Toscana is a German television series based on the experiences of the Donner family, consisting of the father Julius (Stefan Wigger), the mother Rosl (Renate Schroeter), their daughter Bea (Muriel Baumeister) and their son Markus (Oliver Clemens), from Freising in her holiday home in Tuscany.

See also
List of German television series

External links
 

1991 German television series debuts
1994 German television series endings
German-language television shows
Television shows set in Tuscany
Das Erste original programming